The Oregon Ducks women's basketball team is the official women's basketball team of the University of Oregon in Eugene, Oregon. Basketball is one of 11 varsity women's sports at the University of Oregon. The team is a member of the Pac-12 Conference and a Division I team in the National Collegiate Athletic Association. Matthew Knight Arena is the home venue for both women's and men's basketball and women's volleyball. Nike provides the official team uniforms for University of Oregon sports teams.

History
Women's basketball (as a zoned, single-dribble game) at the University of Oregon started as a club in 1899, brought to Oregon by physical education instructor Alice Chapman, wife of University President Charles Chapman. With a women's intercollegiate game emerging at Willamette University, Oregon Agricultural College, Pacific University, and elsewhere, an effort was made during the 1902–03 academic year to organize a women's university team. This effort was waylaid by the Oregon faculty athletic committee early in January 1903, however, with the committee deeming it "not advisable" for the "young ladies' basketball team" to enter into intercollegiate games.<ref name=Committee>"Will Strive for Footlight Plaudits," 'Eugene Register, vol. 9, no. 133 (Jan. 9, 1903), p. 6.</ref> Instead, it was hoped that two campus teams could be organized to keep competition on a local level.

The sport became an "interest group" in 1965. Intercollegiate games also began in 1965, and in 1966, the women's team entered the Northwest College Women's Sports Association (which would eventually become the AIAW Region 9 conference). The program became official in 1973, the year following the passage of Title IX, which required federally supported universities to offer equal opportunities in men's and women's athletics. They have an all-time record (as of the end of the 2015–16 season) of 706–507. They previously played in the Northwest Basketball League from 1977 to 1982 (47–5 all-time record) and the NorPac Conference from 1982 to 1986 (34–12 all-time record) before the Pacific-10 Conference, now known as the Pac-12 Conference, began sponsoring women's sports in 1986. The Ducks' current all-time conference record is 260–280. They won the Women's National Invitation Tournament in 2002 54–52 over Houston.

Postseason

NCAA tournament results
The Ducks have appeared in 17 NCAA tournaments. Their combined record is 17–16.

Historical NCAA Tournament SeedingPac-10/12 Tournament Seeding''

Bold indicates tournament champion

Current roster

Coaching history
Jane Spearing coached the first official season for the Ducks in 1973–74. The team finished that season with a 3–8 losing record. The 1974–75 and 1975–76 seasons were coached by Nancy Mikleton and the team posted 2–10 and 5–15 records, respectively. Head coach Elwin Heiny took over the program in 1976 and remained coach until 1993. Heiny was the first full-time coach hired for women's basketball. In his first season as head coach, Heiny coached the team to its first winning record (11–6). Jody Runge took over as head coach in 1993 and coached until 2001. She coached the Ducks to NCAA tournament appearances during each of her eight seasons as coach. Runge also spoke out for equality in women's athletics. From 2001 to 2009, former Oregon Ducks All-American Bev Smith coached the team, posting an 83–69 overall record. Paul Westhead coached the Ducks from the 2009–10 season through the 2013–14 season. The current head coach is Kelly Graves, assisted by Associate Head Coach Mark Campbell, and Assistant Coaches Jodie Berry and Xavi López.

Facilities 
The early women's basketball clubs played in Gerlinger Hall on the University of Oregon campus, built in 1927 to serve as the women's gymnasium. Games eventually moved to McArthur Court (also called Mac Court and "The Pit") — one of the most renowned college athletic facilities of all time. Admission was first charged for women's games at Mac Court in 1978. The Ducks relocated when Matthew Knight Arena opened in 2011. In their first game in Matthew Knight, the women's team defeated Oregon State University in the "Civil War," 81–72.

Statistical leaders
Current through Oregon's game against Oregon State on December 13, 2020. Players active in the 2020–21 season are in bold type.

Career leaders

Single-season leaders

Oregon women's basketball players in professional teams

References

External links
 
Oregon Women's College Basketball – Ducks News, Scores, Videos – College Basketball – ESPN